Josef Kriehuber (14 December 1800 – 30 May 1876) was an Austrian lithographer and painter, notable for the high quality of his lithographic portraits. He made numerous portraits for nobility, well-known personalities, and government officials. Josef Kriehuber left more than 3000 lithographs, with portraits of many people.

Life 
Josef Kriehuber was born in Vienna, Austria on 14 December 1800. He was first trained by his brother Johann Kriehuber, then studied at the Vienna Academy under Hubert Maurer, then moved to Galicia, where he devoted himself to horse painting. He worked as a lithographer for several Viennese publishing houses. With nearly 3,000 works, Josef Kriehuber was the most important portrait lithographer of the Viennese Biedermeier period.  Kriehuber is also noted for his studies of the Prater park. He taught at the Vienna Theresianum academy.

Kriehuber was only 13 years old when he went to the art-class in the Imperial Academy in Vienna. In 1818, he accompanied the prince Sanguszko as a drawing-master to Poland. In 1821 he returned to Vienna. To earn himself money for the course at the academy, and for the cost of living, he became one of the most industrious lithographic employees of the publishing company Trentsensky. In 1826, his first portraits using the new printing technique of lithography appear. In the next few decades, Kriehuber becomes the most sought-after and best-paid portraitist of Biedermeier Vienna. His success probably stems from the fact that he is a master of portraying men as more distinguished, and women as prettier, than they are in reality.

His works, an image of the Viennese society of this epoch, include nearly 3000 portrait-lithographs, along with a few hundred water-colours. There are but few well-known persons of that time who did not have their portrait made by Kriehuber. Names include: Francis I of Austria, Fürst von Metternich, Josef Radetzky, Franz Grillparzer, Johann Nestroy, Archduke Johann, Friedrich Halm, Friedrich Hebbel, Hammer-Purgstall, Franz Schubert, Anton Diabelli, Robert Schumann, Giacomo Meyerbeer, Carl Czerny, Franz Liszt, Sigismond Thalberg, Ole Bull, Niccolò Paganini, Elias Parish Alvars, Fritz Reuter, Therese Krones, Fanny Elßler, Archduke Karl Ludwig, Sophie of Austria, Marie-Louise of Austria, Johann Kaspar von Seiller, Hector Berlioz, Stephan Endlicher, Ignaz von Seyfried, Moritz Gottlieb Saphir, Carl von Ghega, Wilhelm von Tegetthoff, Ferdinand Maximilian von Austria.

In 1860 he was hailed as first artist awarded the Franz Joseph Order in Austria. With the advances of photography, however, commissions fell off; Kriehuber's last years were overshadowed by poverty. He died on 30 May 1876, in his native city of Vienna. His final resting place, now an honorary grave, is in Vienna's "Zentralfriedhof" (central cemetery).

Significant collections of his works are in the Albertina (Vienna), and in the portrait collection of the Austrian National Library in Vienna. Since 1889 a street in Vienna-Margareten (Vienna's 5th district), has been named after Kriehuber.

Notes

References 
 Wolfgang von Wurzbach: Catalog of the Portrait-Lithograhs of Josef Kriehuber. – 2. Auflage. Vienna: Walter Krieg Verlag, 1958
 Selma Krasa: Josef Kriehuber 1800–1876: The Portraitist of an Epoch. – Vienna: Edition Christian Brandstätter, 1987
 Joseph Kriehuber. In Constantin von Wurzbach: Biographical Lexicon of the Kaiserthums Austria. Volume 13. Vienna 1865.
 Ulrich Thieme and Felix Becker: Allgemeines Lexicon of the Image Artist from the Antique until the Gegenwart, Bd. 21, 1927, S. 535 ff.
 Rudolf von Eitelberger von Edelberg: Gesammelte kunsthistorische Schriften (Collected Art-history Writings), Band 1, S. 90. Wien: Braumüller, 1879.

External links 

 
 Works of Josef Kriehuber - Museum portal Schleswig-Holstein

1800 births
1876 deaths
Artists from Vienna
Austrian lithographers
19th-century Austrian painters
19th-century Austrian male artists
Austrian male painters
Academy of Fine Arts Vienna alumni
Burials at the Vienna Central Cemetery